The 1962–63 Yugoslav Second League season was the 17th season of the Second Federal League, the second level association football competition of SFR Yugoslavia, since its establishment in 1946. The league was contested in two regional groups (West Division and East Division), with 16 clubs each, four more than in the previous season.

West Division

Teams
A total of sixteen teams contested the league, including ten sides from the 1961–62 season, one club relegated from the 1961–62 Yugoslav First League and five sides promoted from the third tier leagues played in the 1961–62 season. The league was contested in a double round robin format, with each club playing every other club twice, for a total of 30 rounds. Two points were awarded for wins and one point for draws.

Borac Banja Luka were relegated from the 1961–62 Yugoslav First League after finishing in the 12th place of the league table and losing in the relegation play-offs against Sloboda. The five clubs promoted to the second level were BSK Slavonski Brod, Famos Hrasnica, Istra, Olimpija Ljubljana and Rudar Kakanj.

League table

East Division

Teams
A total of sixteen teams contested the league, including nine sides from the 1961–62 season, one club relegated from the 1961–62 Yugoslav First League and six sides promoted from the third tier leagues played in the 1961–62 season. The league was contested in a double round robin format, with each club playing every other club twice, for a total of 30 rounds. Two points were awarded for wins and one point for draws.

Vardar were relegated from the 1961–62 Yugoslav First League after finishing in the 11th place of the league table and losing in the relegation play-offs against Radnički Niš. The six clubs promoted to the second level were Bačka, Borac Čačak, Budućnost Peć, Jedinstvo Zemun, OFK Subotica and Železničar Niš.

League table

See also
1962–63 Yugoslav First League
1962–63 Yugoslav Cup

Yugoslav Second League seasons
Yugo
2